The Tamil National People's Front (TNPF) is a Sri Lankan political alliance which represents the Sri Lankan Tamil ethnic minority in the country. It was launched on 28 February 2010 as breakaway faction of the Tamil National Alliance (TNA). Its main constituent is the All Ceylon Tamil Congress and it also includes former TNA Jaffna district MPs Selvarajah Kajendren and Pathmini Sithamparanathan.

It contests under the Ideology of "Two-Nations in One Country" meaning Sri Lankan State as the country comprising the Sinhala nation and the Tamil nation in a pluri-national society and supports Federalism as a model to achieve this goal. But diverges from the TNA in that the TNPF does not agree on the devolutionary path to federalism. It also opposes both the concept of Sri Lankan nation state and the concept of a Sinhala State.

2010 Parliamentary General Election

References

2010 establishments in Sri Lanka
Political parties established in 2010
Political parties in Sri Lanka
Political party alliances in Sri Lanka
Tamil Eelam
Sri Lankan Tamil nationalist parties